Pierce City High School is the public high school for Pierce City, Missouri, United States.

They have a basketball team.

Notable alumni
 Jack Goodman, was a Republican member of the Missouri Senate

References

External links
 

Public high schools in Missouri
Lawrence County, Missouri